The Aspen Shortsfest is an annual Oscar® qualifying short film festival held in Aspen, Colorado. The internationally-recognized festival began in 1979.

In 2003, director Lionel Bailliu was given the Shortfest Award for the 2002 French short film called Squash.

In 2004, director Taika Waititi was given the Aspen Shortsfest Best Drama Award for the 2004 New Zealand short film called Two Cars, One Night.

See also 
 List of Short Film Festivals

References

External links

Film festivals in Colorado
Short film festivals in the United States